

The DFW T.28 Floh was a small German biplane fighter prototype designed by Hermann Dorner, the designer of the successful Hannover CL.II two-seat fighter of 1917, and built by Deutsche Flugzeug-Werke. 

Designed in 1915 as high-speed fighter, the Floh had a small  wingspan and a rather ungainly tall and thin fuselage. With a fixed conventional landing gear the Floh was powered by a  Mercedes D.I inline piston engine, and on its first flight in December 1915 reached , quite fast for the time. 

The aircraft suffered from very poor forward visibility and was difficult to land due to its narrow landing gear. The prototype crashed during the flight testing programme.

Specifications

References

Notes

Bibliography

1910s German fighter aircraft
Floh
Aircraft first flown in 1915